Daniele Monroe-Moreno (born 1964) is a Democratic member of the Nevada Assembly. She represents the 1st district, which covers parts of North Las Vegas.

Biography
Monroe-Moreno was born in 1964 in Tucson, Arizona, moving to Nevada in 1994. She worked for the Maricopa County Sheriff's Office and later as a corrections officer for the North Las Vegas Police Department. Monroe-Moreno was a member of the North Las Vegas Steering Committee from 2000 until 2002. She served as second vice chair of the Clark County Democratic Party from 2011 until 2015, and was elected to the Assembly in 2016, defeating Howard Brean with nearly 60% of the vote.

In April 2017, Monroe-Moreno introduced a bill in the Assembly which would ban private prisons in the state. Despite it passing in both the House and Senate, the bill was vetoed by Governor Brian Sandoval, who stated, "...because the bill improperly encroaches on the authority and discretion of the executive branch of state government, including the State Board of Prison Commissioners, I cannot support it."

In March 2023, Monroe-Moreno, a moderate, was elected chair of the Nevada Democratic Party beating incumbent Judith Whitmer, a progressive. Monroe-Moreno is the first Black woman to chair the Nevada Democratic Party.

Personal life
Monroe-Moreno has three children; Candace, Cassandra, and Celena, and two grandchildren.

Political positions
Monroe-Moreno supports increasing the minimum wage. She also supports increased funding for behavior and mental health programs.

Electoral history

References

|-

1964 births
21st-century American politicians
21st-century American women politicians
American prison officers
Democratic Party members of the Nevada Assembly
Living people
People from North Las Vegas, Nevada
Politicians from Tucson, Arizona
Women state legislators in Nevada